The Porongos River  is a river in Uruguay.

Location

It is situated in Flores Department.

The city of Trinidad, Uruguay is close by. On Route 14, circa 8 km from Trinidad, the 'Don Ricardo' bathing area  on the banks of the Porongos River has amenities maintained by the local municipality.

Fluvial system
The Porongos River is a tributary of the Yi River. Rising in a range of hills known as the Cuchilla Grande, the river mainly runs from south to north, for a distance of 67 km.

Name
The river has given its name to a local football club, based in Trinidad, Uruguay, given the city's proximity.

See also

 Geography of Uruguay#Topography and hydrography
 Yi River#Fluvial system

References

 :es:Arroyo Porongos
 :es:Centro Recreativo Porongos Fútbol Club
 

Rivers of Uruguay
Tributaries of the Uruguay River
Rivers of Flores Department